SCB Park Plaza or Siam Commercial Bank Park Plaza is a high-rise building complex located on Ratchadaphisek Road in Chatuchak District, Bangkok, Thailand.

There are 4 buildings divided into West and East:

 SCB Park Plaza 1 (37 floors)
 SCB Park Plaza 2 (24 floors)
 SCB Park Plaza 3 (24 floors)
 SCB Park Plaza 4 (12 floors)

SCB Park and Plaza is known for its skylight, and roof panels through the usage of the curtain wall system and aluminum cladding. Glass is used for the curtain wall, creating a great advantage where natural light can penetrate deeper within the building. This glass reflects the sunlight of the building creating glare at sunrise and sunset.

SCB Park Plaza curtain wall and Aluminum cladding developers YHS International Company Limited and architect Robert G Boughey and Associates Co., Ltd. helped put together this system.

SCB Park Plaza and Lao Peng Nguan were two of the first high-rise buildings in Bangkok to receive the 'Safety Building Certification'. In which its West Buildings were the first area to receive the R.1 Certification (Safety Building Certification). It became an example of strict compliance with the 'Law for Building Safety Evaluation.' It uses an average of 40 Million Baht from its budget to invest in Building safety; plus, its safety team.

SCB Park houses a number of domestic and foreign companies. Siam Commercial Bank has its headquarters in SCB Park Plaza 1. Accordingly, it also rents out the building to about 80% of foreign companies. For instance, Unilever has its headquarters in one of the buildings. The complex was completed in 1996, SCB Park Plaza 1 has a height of 135 m. The complex has also a shopping plaza with restaurants.

Nearby attractions
 Major Cineplex Ratchayothin
 Wind Ratchayothin the new 38 story condo that is finished in 2009.
 Suzuki Avenue a local mall for people living in Ratchayothin.
 Elephant Building

External links
 Emporis

References38-story

Siam Commercial Bank
Skyscrapers in Bangkok
Chatuchak district
Skyscraper office buildings in Thailand
Office buildings completed in 1996